Fruitdale, sometimes called Fruitdale Acres, is an area in Dallas, Texas, United States that used to be its own incorporated city.

On April 17, 1937 Fruitdale incorporated so it would not be annexed by Dallas. In October 1964 residents voted to disincorporate and Dallas annexed Fruitdale in November of that year.

External links
 FRUITDALE, TEXAS at Handbook of Texas

Former cities in Texas
Neighborhoods in Dallas
Populated places established in 1937
1937 establishments in Texas